The Journal of Early Childhood Literacy is a quarterly peer-reviewed academic journal that covers research in the field of child literacy, including the history, development and teaching of literacy. The journal's editors-in-chief are Jackie Marsh (University of Sheffield), Guy Merchant (Sheffield Hallam University), Julia Gillen (University of Lancaster), Pauline Harris, (University of South Australia) and Deborah Wells Rowe (Vanderbilt University). It was established in 2001 and is currently published by SAGE Publications.

Abstracting and indexing 
The journal is abstracted and indexed in:
 Academic Premier
 British Education Index
 Educational Research Abstracts Online
 Family Index Database
 Studies on Women & Gender Abstracts
 Scopus

External links 
 

SAGE Publishing academic journals
English-language journals
Education journals
Publications established in 2001
Quarterly journals